The 2018–19 Grand Canyon Antelopes men's basketball team represents Grand Canyon University during the 2018–19 NCAA Division I men's basketball season. They are led by head coach Dan Majerle in his sixth season at Grand Canyon. The Antelopes play their home games at the GCU Arena in Phoenix, Arizona as members of the Western Athletic Conference. They finished the season 20–14, 10–6 in WAC play to finish in third place. They defeated Seattle and Utah Valley to advance to the championship game of the WAC tournament where they lost to New Mexico State. They were invited to the College Basketball Invitational where they lost in the first round to West Virginia.

Previous season
The Antelopes finished the 2017–18 season 22–12, 9–5 in WAC play to finish in third place. They defeated UMKC and Utah Valley to advance to the championship game of the WAC tournament where they lost to New Mexico State. They were invited to the College Basketball Invitational where they lost in the first round to Mercer.

Roster

Schedule and results

|-
!colspan=12 style=| Exhibition

|-
!colspan=12 style=| Regular season

|-
!colspan=12 style=| WAC tournament

|-
!colspan=12 style=| College Basketball Invitational

Source

References

Grand Canyon Antelopes men's basketball seasons
Grand Canyon
Grand Canyon Antelopes men's basketball
Grand Canyon Antelopes men's basketball
Grand Canyon